Chintalagraharam is a neighborhood in Visakhapatnam of the Indian state of Andhra Pradesh.

Transport
APSRTC routes

Neighbourhoods in Visakhapatnam

References